Neptis carcassoni, or Carcasson's sailer, is a butterfly in the family Nymphalidae. It is found in Tanzania, Malawi, Zambia, Mozambique and eastern Zimbabwe. The habitat consists of lowland forests.

Adults are on wing nearly year round.

The larvae feed on Dalbergia lactea.

References

Butterflies described in 1959
carcassoni